Gold Line, Gold line, or Goldline may refer to:

Transportation

Rail
Gold Line (MARTA), a rapid transit line in Atlanta, Georgia
Gold Line (RTD), a commuter rail line in Denver, Colorado
Gold Line (Sacramento RT), a light rail line in Sacramento, California
CityLynx Gold Line, a streetcar line in Charlotte, North Carolina
Gold Line (Bangkok), an automated people mover in Bangkok, Thailand
Gimpo Goldline, a light metro line of the Seoul Metropolitan Subway
Tokyo Metro Yūrakuchō Line, color-coded "gold", a rapid transit line in Tokyo, Japan
Gold Line (Doha Metro), a rapid transit line of the Doha Metro
 Gold Line (Guangzhou)
 Gold Line (Madrid Metro)
 Gold Line (Mexico City)
 Gold Line (Osaka Metro)
 Gold Line (Paris)
 Gold Line (São Paulo Metro)
L Line (Los Angeles Metro), a light rail line in Los Angeles County, California
Seoul Subway Line 9, a rapid transit line in Seoul, South Korea

Bus
Travel Washington's Gold Line, an intercity bus line in Washington state
Goldline, a brand of Ulsterbus, Northern Ireland
Goldline Travel, a brand of Reading Buses, England
Stagecoach Goldline, a brand of the Stagecoach Group, United Kingdom
Gold Line (Washington, D.C.), a brand of commuter bus service in the Washington, D.C. area operated by Martz Group
Metro Gold Line (Minnesota), a proposed bus rapid transit line in Minneapolis, Minnesota

Retailers
Goldline International, a retail seller of gold and silver coins, and precious metals for investors and collectors

Zoology
Salema porgy (Sarpa salpa), an East Atlantic and Mediterranean fish also known as goldline
Goldline darter, threatened due to water quality degradation on the Cahaba River
 Goldline blenny

See also
Yellow Line (disambiguation)
Orange Line (disambiguation)